Bukedea is a town in the Eastern Region of Uganda. It is the chief municipal, administrative, and commercial center of Bukedea District, and the district headquarters are located there.

Location
Bukedea is situated on the main highway (A-109) between Mbale and Soroti. The coordinates of the town are:01 20 51N, 34 02 40E (Latitude:1.347500; Longitude:34.044444).

Population
According to the Uganda Bureau of Statistics (UBOS), the population of Bukedea Town in 2015, was 11,300. In 2020, UBOS estimated the mid-year population of the town at 13,900, of whom 7,000 (50.4 percent) were females and 6,900 (49.6 percent) were male. The population of the town was calculated to grow at an estimated rate of 4.23 percent annually between 2015 and 2020.

Points of interest
The following points of interest are located within the town limits or close to the edges of town:
(a) the headquarters of Bukedea District Administration (b) the offices of Bukedea Town Council (c) a mobile branch of PostBank Uganda (d) Bukedea central market, the source of fresh daily produce and (e) the Tororo–Mbale–Soroti Road passes through town in a general southeast to northwest direction.

The area member of parliament (MP), is John Bosco Ikojo, a member of the ruling National Resistance Movement political party, who serves as the chairperson of the Parliamentary Committee on the National Economy in the 11th Parliament (2021–2026).

See also
List of cities and towns in Uganda
Teso sub-region

References

External links
Bukedea Town Rewards Cleanest Homes

Populated places in Eastern Region, Uganda
Cities in the Great Rift Valley
Bukedea District
Teso sub-region